The men's 400 metres hurdles event at the 2016 African Championships in Athletics was held on 23 and 24 June in Kings Park Stadium.

Medalists

Results

Heats
Qualification: First 2 of each heat (Q) and the next 2 fastest (q) qualified for the final.

Final

References

2016 African Championships in Athletics
400 metres hurdles at the African Championships in Athletics